Killeedy is a civil parish located south of Newcastle West in Co. Limerick in Ireland.  This parish consists of two villages, Ashford and Raheenagh.  The elevation of the parish varies from 1,184 ft. OS at Mauricetown and 1,082 ft. at Dromdeeveen to 200 ft. OS at Ballintubber.  The parish is overlooked by the Mullaghareirk Mountains.  The patron saint of Killeedy is Saint Ita.  Killeedy used to be known as Cluain Chreadhail but in later ages it had taken the name of Cill íde, the Church of Saint Ita, from a nunnery which was founded there in the sixth century.  On 15 January of each year, the feast of St. Ita's Day is celebrated in Killeedy.

The villages 

Located in Ashford is St. Ita's Church, a primary school, a Montessori and The Village Inn Pub. The Village Inn pub has had great success in Darts particularly in recent years winning the Desmond Darts League premier division two years in a row. They also host the annual James Kelly Memorial Darts tournament. The soccer pitch for St. Itas AFC is also in Ashford.  The Ashford Queen of the West Festival was held during the summers from 1989 and throughout the 1990s as part of the local Gaelic Athletic Association (GAA) club's fund raising activities.

In Raheenagh, there is St Ita's Church, Páirc íde Naofa (the GAA pitch), a primary school, the community centre, a sports complex, a shop, and a pub.

Sports 

The sports played competitively in Killeedy are hurling, camogie, Gaelic football and soccer. The local GAA club is Killeedy GAA. The club is heavily concentrated on the game of hurling and camogie with a little Gaelic football also being played. They play in blue and white and their ground is called Páirc Íde Naofa and is located in Raheenagh village. The club has successfully hosted the Munster, Leinster and All-Ireland Junior B Club Hurling Series since 2005. 

The Killeedy club has won numerous west and county championships over the years but the pinnacle of their success came in 1980 when they won the County Senior Hurling Championship beating Patrickswell in the final. The following year, Killeedy man Paudie Fitzmaurice (one of the Killeedy Fitzmaurice brothers, along with his brother Willie Fitzmaurice) captained GAA to win the Munster Senior Hurling Championship. Another Killeedy man, Donie Flynn, was joint manager of the Limerick senior hurlers from 1988 to 1991. Killeedy currently compete at the Junior A grade in Limerick.

Saint Ita's AFC are the local soccer club in Killeedy and were founded in 1990, Their pitch is located in Ashford village and they play in blue and white. The junior team competes in the Limerick Desmond League division one. St. Ita's joined at underage level for two seasons with neighboring club Feenagh AFC and went under the moniker of Bluebell United. St. Ita's greatest achievement thus far was their All-Ireland Women's Junior Cup victory in 2006 making them the first Limerick Desmond League side to achieve this. In that same year, their women's team also won the Division 1 title in a playoff against Ballingarry A.F.C. and competed in the first ever Women's Desmond Cup final in which they lost out on penalties to Ballingarry. Their Junior team have had good success also with one of their finest achievements being them reaching the Quarter Final of the Munster Junior Cup in the 2005/06 season where they were beaten by Clonmel Town who would go on to win the competition. As well as this they have won back to back Richard Hogan cups, the Division 2 and Division 3 league titles and the Division 2 league cup.

Landmarks and history 
 Field Marshal Count Peter Lacy was born in Killeedy in 1678. After fighting at the Siege of Limerick in 1691, he emigrated first to France with the Wild Geese, then to the Holy Roman Empire, and finally to Russia under Tsar Peter the Great. There, he became a Field Marshal in the Imperial Russian Army and served as governor of Livonia. His son Franz Moritz (Francis Maurice) von Lacy  was a Field Marshal in Austrian service.

 Tadhg Gaelach Ó Súilleabháin (c. 1715 – 1795), a highly important composer of Christian poetry and Irish bardic poetry in Munster Irish, was also a native of Killeedy.

 In 1916, Thomas Shaughnessy was created the 1st Baron Shaughnessy of the City of Montreal in the Dominion of Canada and of Ashford (in Killeedy) in the County of Limerick. His father Tom Shaughnessy, who was a policeman and detective in Milwaukee, Wisconsin was a native of Ashford in Killeedy.

Notable historic landmarks in Killeedy include St. Ita's Monastery and Cemetery, Killeedy Castle, the Mass Rock, Glenduff Castle, Glenquin Castle, Lough O'Ge and Ballagh Post Office.

Kantoher 
Kantoher creamery was a major source of income for the parish. It was established in 1904 as a local Co-operative processing milk, and finding markets for by products such as cream, cheese, butter and later casein. The cooperative continued to diversify, opening up opportunities for its suppliers by setting up processing facilities for pigs, turkeys, ducks and later poultry. In 1991, Kantoher Creamery was taken over by locally based multinational Kerry Group. Kerry grew the business further but by 2005 decided to cease operations at the poultry plant, its final processing facility there, with the loss of over 300 jobs directly and a further 500 indirectly. Kerry Group continued to process the majority of the milk produced locally in Listowel. Kerry Group maintained support to network of local poultry producers in securing a processing co-operation with Western Brand in Mayo. It also provided support to the newly formed voluntary organisation, Kantoher Development Group, set up to provide sustainable employment for the local community.
Kantoher Enterprise Park currently has six companies operating out of the site providing over 80 jobs directly and another 40 indirectly. The companies based there include BHSL (which has grown a business out of poultry manure and fluidised bed technology), McMahon Ecofuel (leveraging the 6,000 acres of trees planted locally), Tara Cladding (which originally supplied cladding for the building needs of the local farming community and now provides bus shelters with automatic battery recharging), Strand Foods (a chicken processing plant), Pet Vet (a veterinary practice), MEHS (an environmental group that provides consultancy services), FÁS/SOLAS (provides employment to over 12 people), and Killeedy Group Water Scheme (the local water group).

References

External links
 Killeedy Parish
 Killeedy GAA Club

Civil parishes of County Limerick